Anna Dmitrievna Egorova (born 31 May 1998) is a Russian swimmer. She competed in the women's 800 metre freestyle event at the 2018 European Aquatics Championships, winning the bronze medal.

References

External links
 

1998 births
Living people
Place of birth missing (living people)
Russian female freestyle swimmers
European Aquatics Championships medalists in swimming
European Championships (multi-sport event) bronze medalists
European Championships (multi-sport event) silver medalists
Universiade medalists in swimming
Universiade gold medalists for Russia
Medalists at the 2017 Summer Universiade
Swimmers at the 2020 Summer Olympics
Olympic swimmers of Russia